Paul R. Greenough is professor emeritus at the University of Iowa. He is a specialist in the history of modern India, and environmental and global health history. He was also chair of the Global Health Studies Program. He is the recipient of the Hancher-Finkbine Medallion.

Selected publications
 Prosperity and Misery in Modern Bengal: The Famine of 1943-44. Oxford University Press, New York, 1982.
 Nature in the Global South: Environmental Projects in South and Southeast Asia, Duke University Press, 2003. (co-editor with Anna L. Tsing).
 Against Stigma: Comparing Caste and Race in an Era of Global Justice. Orient Black Swan, 2010.
 The Politics of Vaccination: A global history. Edited with Christine Holmberg and Stuart Blume, 2017. (Social Histories of Medicine)

References

External links 
Bio
Academia

Historians of India
University of Iowa faculty
Year of birth missing (living people)
Living people